Raymond George Dauber (October 24, 1903 – February 7, 1965) was an American football player, track and field athlete, and coach of multiple sports.  He served as the head football coach at Western Reserve University—now a part of Case Western Reserve University—for one game in 1930 and at Mississippi State University from 1931 to 1932, compiling a career college football record of 6–11 record.  Dauber was also the head basketball coach at Mississippi State from 1927 to 1933 and at Tulane University from 1933 to 1938, tallying a career college basketball mark of 64–114.  In addition, he coached track and cross country at Western Reserve in the mid-1920s.

Coaching career
Dauber served as an assistant football coach at Mississippi State from 1929 to 1930. In 1929, he and head coach John W. Hancock formed one of the youngest coaching staffs in the country. In 1934, he was serving as the freshman team coach at Tulane University. He was promoted to ends coach in 1936. Dauber also coached the Tulane basketball team. He resigned from Tulane in March 1938.

Head coaching record

Football

Notes

References

External links
 

1903 births
1965 deaths
Case Western Spartans cross country coaches
Case Western Spartans football coaches
Case Western Spartans track and field coaches
Iowa Hawkeyes men's track and field athletes
Iowa Hawkeyes football players
Mississippi State Bulldogs men's basketball coaches
Mississippi State Bulldogs football coaches
Tulane Green Wave football coaches
Tulane Green Wave men's basketball coaches
Sportspeople from Duluth, Minnesota
Coaches of American football from Minnesota
Players of American football from Duluth, Minnesota
Basketball coaches from Minnesota